Molyneux Bay is a bay on the south east coast of the South Island in the Otago Region of New Zealand. The bay is the location of the mouth of the Clutha River / Mata-Au and the estuarial river island of Inch Clutha.

Naming
The name of the bay first appears on James Cook's charts mapped during his first voyage. It was named after Robert Molyneux (or Molineux), the sailing master of the HMS Endeavour who died on the return voyage to England.

History
The former settlement of Port Molyneux stood on the shore of Molyneux Bay until a major flood altered the course of the river, making the port unviable.

References

Bays of Otago
The Catlins
Clutha District